The Muddy River is a stream, about  long, southeast of Mount St. Helens in the U.S. state of Washington. The Muddy River flows south–southeast and joins the Lewis River just above the Swift Reservoir. The Lewis River flows west and is a tributary to the Columbia River. The east flank of Mount St. Helens is within the watershed of Muddy Creek.

During the 1980 eruption of Mount St. Helens, lahars (volcanically-induced mud and debris flows) swept through its channel. About  of stream channels around the volcano were affected by lahars.

The United States Forest Service maintains the Muddy River Picnic Site, next to the river and to Forest Road 25 in the Gifford Pinchot National Forest. Trails cross the river on its upper reaches.

Course
Muddy River originates at about the  level on the southeast side of Mount St. Helens in the Cascade Range. The river source is within Mount St. Helens National Volcanic Monument and Gifford Pinchot National Forest. Shoestring Glacier is to the right and East Dome is to the left. Flowing southeast down steep slopes, the river curves sharply to the northeast just beyond the  level of the volcano. Here the river crosses Forest Road 83 and passes the Ape Canyon Trailhead and the Lava Canyon Interpretive Site, both on the left, before entering Muddy River Gorge.

Flowing northeast through the gorge, the stream plunges over three waterfalls before emerging from the narrows and curving sharply again to the southeast. Here Crane Lake is on the left, Smith Creek enters from the left, and Smith Creek Trailhead is on the right. Slightly downstream of the trailhead, the river leaves the national volcanic monument but remains in the national forest. At about the  level, Clearwater Creek enters from the left. At the road crossing, Muddy Creek Picnic Site is on the left.

Below the confluence with Clear Creek, the river meanders through Cedar Flats, leaves the national forest slightly more than a mile from the mouth, and passes a United States Geological Survey (USGS) stream gauge, on the left  from the mouth.

Discharge
The high flow in 1996 was associated with general flooding in the Pacific Northwest during the Willamette Valley Flood of 1996.

A flood destroyed an earlier version of the gauge in January 1974. The existing gauge began recording data in October 1983. The mudflow flood related to the eruption of Mount St. Helens in 1980 occurred outside the period of record for either gauge.

See also
Lava Canyon Falls
List of rivers of Washington
Tributaries of the Columbia River

References

External links 
 USGS CVO maps, data, and resources related to the Muddy River and the eruption of Mt. St. Helens

Rivers of Washington (state)
Rivers of Skamania County, Washington
Gifford Pinchot National Forest